Victorian Railways J class may refer to:

Victorian Railways J class (1859)
Victorian Railways J class (1954)